N. Kopelman (Koppelman) (1881 ? – 1944, Moscow?) was a Russian chess player.

He participated in the Mannheim 1914 chess tournament. After the declaration of war against Russia, eleven "Russian" players (Alexander Alekhine, Bogoljubov, Bogatyrchuk, Flamberg, Koppelman, Maliutin, Rabinovich, Romanovsky, Saburov, Selezniev, Weinstein) were interned in Rastatt, Germany. On September 14, 17, and 29, 1914, four of them (Alekhine, Bogatyrchuk, Saburov, and Koppelman) were freed and allowed to return home via Switzerland.

He took 7th at St. Petersburg 1915 (Alexander Ilyin-Zhenevsky and Golubev won), and took 8th at Moscow 1920 (All-Russian Chess Olympiad, elim., Alexei Alekhine won).

References

Russian Jews
Chess players from the Russian Empire
Jewish chess players
Year of birth uncertain
1944 deaths